is a shrine in Kamakura, Kanagawa Prefecture, Japan. It was erected by Emperor Meiji in 1869 to enshrine the spirit of Prince Morinaga, who was imprisoned and later executed where the shrine now stands in 1335 by order of Ashikaga Tadayoshi.

Prince Morinaga was Ashikaga Takauji's most dangerous political rival in Kyoto, so he was arrested with a pretext by him in 1334 and first kept prisoner there, then had him sent to Kamakura. Ashikaga's younger brother Tadayoshi held Morinaga captive for nine months in a small cave at the site of the present Kamakura-gū. When Tadayoshi was forced to retreat from Kamakura after losing a battle to Hōjō Tokiyuki, before leaving he gave the order for Morinaga's execution. The Prince was beheaded on July 23, 1335. The cave still exists today in the rockface behind the shrine, and is a tourist attraction. It is four meters deep and has an area of 12 square meters.

It is one of the Fifteen Shrines of the Kenmu Restoration.

See also
 Modern system of ranked Shinto Shrines

References
 

Religious buildings and structures completed in 1869
1869 establishments in Japan
Shinto shrines in Kanagawa Prefecture